Ciarán Mullan (22 March 1984) is a Gaelic footballer who plays for the Derry county team, with whom he has won a National League title. He plays his club football for St Matthew's Drumsurn. He plays in the forward line for both club and county.

Football career

Inter-county

Mullan was part of the Derry Minor side that won the 2002 Ulster Minor and All-Ireland Minor Championships. He was a member of the Derry Under 21 team that finished runners-up in the 2004 Ulster Under 21 Championship.

He made his Derry Senior debut in 2004, but did not make his Championship debut until Round 2 of the Qualifiers against Kildare in July 2006. Mullan missed most of the 2007 season, due to being in the United States, but has returned for the 2008 campaign. He helped Derry reach the 2008 Dr McKenna Cup final, where they were defeated by Down. He was part of the Derry team that won the 2008 National League where Derry beat Kerry in the final.

Club
Mullan plays club football for Drumsurn. While in the United States in 2007 he was played for the Four Provinces team (from Philadelphia) that won the New York Senior Football Championship.

Honours

Inter-county
National Football League:
Winner (1): 2008
Dr McKenna Cup:
Runner up: 2008, more?
Ulster Under-21 Football Championship:
Runner up: 2004
All-Ireland Minor Football Championship:
Winner (1): 2002
Ulster Minor Football Championship:
Winner (1): 2002

Club
New York Senior Football Championship:
Winner (1): 2007

Note: The above lists may be incomplete. Please add any other honours you know of.

References

External links
Player profiles on Official Derry GAA website
St. Matthew's GAC website

1984 births
Living people
Derry inter-county Gaelic footballers
Drumsurn Gaelic footballers
Irish expatriate sportspeople in the United States
New York Gaelic footballers